Katarina Mišić (Serbian Cyrillic: Катарина Мишић, born 5 February 1976) is a Serbian tennis coach and former professional tennis player.

In her career, she won four singles and eleven doubles titles on the ITF Women's Circuit. On 4 August 2003, she reached her best singles ranking of world No. 220. On 19 May 2003, she peaked at No. 151 in the doubles rankings.

Playing for FR Yugoslavia Fed Cup team from 1995 until 2003, she had a win–loss record of 15–8. Other than her debut year in the Fed Cup in 1995, she played under last name Dašković in 14 ties between 2000–2003.

Belgrade-born Mišić retired from pro tour in 2005.

ITF finals

Singles (4–3)

Doubles (11–11)

References

External links
 
 
 

1976 births
Living people
Tennis players from Belgrade
Serbian female tennis players
Serbian tennis coaches
Serbia and Montenegro female tennis players
Yugoslav female tennis players